may refer to:

 Edith Finch Russell (1900–1978), writer, biographer, and the fourth wife of Bertrand Russell.
 Edith Rosenbaum (1879–1975), American fashion buyer, stylist and correspondent for Women's Wear Daily, best remembered for surviving the 1912 sinking of the RMS Titanic; due to rampant anti-German sentiment in Paris during and just after the World War I, Rosenbaum anglicized her surname to "Russell."